Veterná Poruba (formerly ) is a village and municipality in Liptovský Mikuláš District in the Žilina Region of northern Slovakia.

History
In historical records the village was first mentioned in 1353 as Poruba. and was created by colonizing the lands of the family Okolicsányi, who owned the village until 1848. In 1715, 16 taxpayers lived in the village, in 1784 the village had 40 houses and 302 inhabitants, in 1828 there were 37 houses and 336 inhabitants who were employed as farmers and forest workers. 

Not far from Veterná Poruba is the former village of Svätý Štefan, which was first mentioned in 1272 and was named after the patronage of the local church. In 1719 the village was abandoned after a natural disaster.

Geography
The municipality lies in the middle part of the Liptov basin on the ridge of the hill Štefanka at an altitude of 820 meters, which belongs to the higher sub-Tatra villages. The village is located northeast of 9 kilometers from the district town of Liptovský Mikuláš. To the north of the village rises the ends of the Western Tatras.  It has a population of about 380 people

Government
The village relies on Liptovský Mikuláš for a tax office and police and fire brigade services.

References

External links

 Official Website (Slovak)

Villages and municipalities in Liptovský Mikuláš District